Nationality words link to articles with information on the nation's poetry or literature (for instance, Irish or France).

—Opening lines of "Edge" by Sylvia Plath, written days before her suicide

Events
 January 26 – Raghunath Vishnu Pandit, an Indian poet who writes in both Konkani and Marathi languages, publishes five books of poems this day
 February 11 – American-born poet Sylvia Plath (age 30) commits suicide by carbon monoxide poisoning in her London flat (in a house lived in by W. B. Yeats as a child) during the cold winter of 1962–63 in the United Kingdom about a month after publication of her only novel, the semi-autobiographical The Bell Jar and six days after writing (probably) her last poem, "Edge".
 July–August – The Vancouver Poetry Conference is held over a three-week period, involving about 60 people who attend discussions, workshops, lectures, and readings designed by Warren Tallman and Robert Creeley as a summer course at the University of British Columbia. According to Creeley:

"It brought together for the first time a decisive company of then disregarded poets such as Denise Levertov, Charles Olson, Allen Ginsberg, Robert Duncan, Margaret Avison, Philip Whalen... together with as yet unrecognised younger poets of that time, Michael Palmer, Clark Coolidge and many more."

 The Belfast Group, a discussion group of poets in Northern Ireland, is started by Philip Hobsbaum when he moves to Belfast this year. Before the meetings finally end in 1972, attendees at its meetings will include Seamus Heaney, Michael Longley, James Simmons, Paul Muldoon, Ciaran Carson, Stewart Parker, Bernard MacLaverty and the critics Edna Longley and Michael Allen.
 The Soviet government appears to begin removing freedoms previously granted to writers and artists in a process that began in November 1962 and continues this year. Yet the government proves uncertain and the writers persistent. In March 1963 "the gavel fell on the great debate", or so it appears, writes Harrison E. Salisbury, Moscow correspondent for The New York Times. Khrushchev announces that Soviet writers are the servants of the Communist Party and must reflect its orders. Among the authors he specifically targets are the poets Yevgeny Yevtushenko and Andrei Voznesensky. Yevtushenko, on a tour of European cities earlier in the year, recites before large audiences, including a capacity audience at the Palais de Chaillot in Paris, and then returns home. "Literary Stalinists took over almost all the key publishing positions", Salisbury writes. Yet the artists and writers who are criticized either refuse to recant or do so in innocuous language. Alexander Tvardovsky, editor of the magazine Novy Mir, publishes three brutally frank stories by Aleksandr Solzhenitsyn, for instance. By midsummer, the effects of the announced crackdown appear nil, with authors publishing essentially as before. After the Union of Soviet Writers rebukes Voznesensky, he replies "with what is regarded as a classic nonconfessional confession", according to Voznesensky's 2010 obituary in the Times: "It has been said that I must not forget the strict and severe words of Nikita Sergeyevich [Khrushchev]. I will never forget them. He said 'work'. This word is my program." He continues, "What my attitude is to Communism — what I am myself — this work will show."
 Russian poet Anna Akhmatova's Requiem, an elegy about suffering of Soviet people under the Great Purge, composed 1935–61, is first published complete in book form, without her knowledge, in Munich.
 Ukrainian writer Vasyl Symonenko's Kurds'komu bratovi is written and begins to circulate in samizdat.

Works published in English
Listed by nation where the work was first published and again by the poet's native land, if different; substantial revisions listed separately:

Canada
 Roy Daniells, The Chequered Shade, a collection of short poems, mostly sonnets
 R. G. Everson, Blind Man's Holiday, a first book of poems
 Eldon Grier, A Friction of Lights
 Irving Layton, Balls for a One-Armed Juggler.
 Lionel Kearns, Songs of Circumstance
 Wilson MacDonald, The Angels Of The Earth. Toronto: Nelson.
 Gwendolyn MacEwen, The Rising Fire
 Al Purdy, The Blur in Between
 James Reaney, The Dance of Death at London, Ontario.

Anthologies in Canada
 Frank Scott, translator and editor, Saint-Denys Garneau and Anne Hébert
 The Plough and the Pen: Writings From Hungary 1930-1956, translations of Hungarian populist poets and writers by eight Canadian poets, including Earle Birney, A.J.M. Smith and Raymond Souster

Ireland
 Austin Clarke, Flight to Africa, Dublin: Dolmen Press
 Denis Devlin, Selected Poems, New York: Holt, Rinehart and Winston, Irish poet published in the United States
 Richard Murphy, Sailing to an Island, including "The Poet on the Island", London: Faber and Faber; New York: Chilmark Press, 1965 Irish work published in the United Kingdom

New Zealand
 James K. Baxter, The Ballad of the Soap Powder Lock-Out, a light-hearted work written by a poet who was at this time a postal worker in New Zealand, in connection with a postal workers’ protest against delivering heavy samples of soap powder
 Alistair Campbell, Sanctuary of Spirits
 Keith Sinclair, A Time to Embrace

United Kingdom
 Patricia Beer, The Survivors
 Edwin Bronk, With Love From Judas, Lowestoft, Suffolk: Scorpion Press
 W. H. Davies, The Complete Poems of W. H. Davies, introduction by Sir Osbert Sitwell
 C. Day-Lewis, translation, The Eclogues of Virgil (see also his translations The Georgics of Virgil 1940 and The Aenid of Virgil 1952)
 Lawrence Durrell, editor, New Poems 1963: A P.E.N. Anthology of Contemporary Poetry, London: Hutchinson & Co. Ltd.
 T. S. Eliot, Collected Poems 1909–1962
 Michael Hamburger, Weather and Season, London: Routledge and Kegan Paul; New York: Atheneum
 Philip Hobsbaum and Edward Lucie-Smith, editors, A Group Anthology of young poets, many influenced by Ted Hughes, including George MacBeth, Peter Porter, David Wevill, and Peter Redgrove
 James Kirkup, Refusal to Conform
 Laurence Lerner, The Directions of Memory
 George MacBeth, The Broken Places, Lowestoft, Suffolk: Scorpion Press
 Norman MacCaig, A Round of Applause
 Louis MacNeice, The Burning Perch (posthumous)
 John Clark Milne, Poems (posthumous)
 Richard Murphy, Sailing to an Island, London: Faber and Faber; New York: Chilmark Press, 1965 Irish
 Margaret O'Donnell, editor, An Anthology of Commonwealth Verse, London: Blackie & Son
 Wilfred Owen (killed 1918), The Collected Poems of Wilfred Owen, edited and introduced by C. Day-Lewis
 F. T. Prince, The Doors of Stone
 Peter Redgrove, At the White Monument, and Other Poems, London: Routledge and Kegan Paul
 Bernard Spencer, With Luck Lasting
 R. S. Thomas, The Bread of Truth
 Anthony Thwaite, The Owl in the Tree, London: Oxford University Press
 Charles Tomlinson, A Peopled Landscape, London: Oxford University Press
 Rosemary Tonks, Notes on Cafés and Bedrooms

United States
 Conrad Aiken, The Morning Song of Lord Zero
 John Malcolm Brinnin, Selected Poems
 Gwendolyn Brooks, Selected Poems
 John Ciardi, In Fact
 Evan S. Connell (at this time known as "Evan S. Connell Jr."), Notes From a Bottle Found on the Beach at Carmel
 E.E. Cummings, 73 Poems, posthumously published (died 1962)
 Babette Deutsch, Collected Poems, 1919-1962
 Denis Devlin, Selected Poems, New York: Holt, Rinehart and Winston, Irish poet published in the United States
 Alan Dugan, Poems 2
 Allen Ginsberg, Reality Sandwiches, San Francisco: City Lights Books 6
 Edward Gorey, The Gashlycrumb Tinies
 Daniel G. Hoffman, The City of Satisfactions
 John Hollander, Various Owls
 Robinson Jeffers, The Beginning and the End and Other Poems, posthumously published (died 1962)
 Donald Justice, A Local Storm
 H. P. Lovecraft, Collected Poems
 W. S. Merwin:
 The Moving Target, New York: Atheneum
 Translator, The Song of Roland
 Howard Nemerov, The Next Room of the Dream
 Lou B. ("Bink") Noll, The Center of the Circle, a first volume of poetry
 Mary Oliver, No Voyage, and Other Poems (first edition; later released in an expanded edition in 1965)
 Sylvia Plath, The Bell Jar, an autobiographical novel published under the pseudonym "Victoria Lucas"
 Henry Rago,  A Sky of Light Summer, New York: Macmillan
 John Crowe Ransom, Selected Poems, revised and enlarged edition
 Kenneth Rexroth, Natural Numbers
 Adrienne Rich, Snapshots of a Daughter-in-Law, her third volume of poetry, gains the poet national prominence for her lyric voice, mostly in free verse, and for her treatment of feminist-related themes
 Theodore Roethke, Sequence, Sometimes Metaphysical
 Carl Sandburg, Honey and Salt
 Anne Sexton, All My Pretty Ones
 Louis Simpson, At the End of the Open Road, Middletown, Connecticut: Wesleyan University Press
 William Stafford, Traveling Through the Dark
 Jesse Stuart, Hold April
 May Swenson, To Mix With Time
 John Updike, Telephone Poles, and Other Poems
 Mark Van Doren, Collected and New Poems, 1924-1963
 David Wagoner, The Nesting Ground
 William Carlos Williams, Paterson, all five books of this long poem first published together
 James Wright, The Branch Will Not Break, Middletown, Connecticut: Wesleyan University Press

Criticism, scholarship and biography in the United States
 Louis Zukofsky, Bottom: On Shakespeare a work of literary philosophy
 Robert Bly's "A Wrong Turning in American Poetry" published in Choice

Other in English
 Viresh Chander Dutt, Poems and Meditations, Calcutta: self-published; India, Indian poetry in English
 James McAuley, Australia:
 James McAuley (Australian Poets series), Sydney: Angus & Robertson
 The Six Days of Creation (An Australian Letters publication)
 Chris Wallace-Crabbe, Australia:
 In Light and Darkness, Sydney: Angus & Robertson
 Editor, Six Voices: Contemporary Australian Poets, Sydney: Angus & Robertson; American Edition, Westport, Connecticut: 1979 (anthology)

Works published in other languages
Listed by language and often by nation where the work was first published and again by the poet's native land, if different; substantially revised works listed separately:

Denmark
 Inger Christensen, Græs: digte ("Grass")
 Ivan Malinovski, Romerske Bassiner ("Roman Pools")
 Jørgen Sonne, Krese ("Cycles")

Finland
 Lassi Nummi, Kuutsimittaa
 Aila Meriluoto, Asumattomiin

French language

Canada, in French
 Marie-Claire Blais, Pays voilés, Québec: Éditions Garneau
 Ronald Desprês, Les Cloisons en vertige
 Alfred Desrochers, Le Retour de Titus
 Alain Grandbois, Poèmes
 Gatien Lapointe, Ode au Saint-Laurent
 Wilfred Lemoine, Sauf-conduits
 Pierre Perrault, Toutes isles
 Jean-Guy Pilon, Pour saluer une ville
 Edmond Robillard, Blanc et noir: Poèmes de nature et de grâce, Montréal: Éditions du Lévrier

France
 Louis Aragon, Le Fou d'Elsa
 P. Bealu, Amour me cele, celle que j'aime
 Jacques Dupin, Gravir
 Pierre Emmanuel, pen name of Noël Mathieu, La Nouvelle Naissance
 Leon-Paul Fargue, Poesies, a collection of the author's early books published here posthumously (died 1947) with a preface by Saint-John Perse
 Maurice Fombeure, Quel est ce coeur?
 Paul Gilson, Enigmarelle
 Eugène Guillevic, Sphère
 Edmond Jabès, Le Livre des Questions
 Denis Roche, Récits complets
 Saint-John Perse:
 Au souvenir de Valery Larbaud, Liège: Editions Dynamo
 Oiseaux
 Poésie
 Silence pour Claudel, Liège: Editions Dynamo
 Victor Segalen, Ode, suivi de Thibet
 An anthology of Hungarian poetry translated by poets Jean Rousselot, Jean Follain, and Eugène Guillevic

German
 Christa Reinig, Gedichte (East Germany)
 Erich Fried, Reich der Steine a volume of cycles of poetry
 Rupert Hirschenauer and Albrecht Weber, editors, Wege zum Gedicht, 2 volumes (second volume, on the ballad, published this year, previous volume published in 1956), scholarship
 Peter Huchel, Chausseen, Chausseen: Gedichte (East Germany)

Hebrew
 Nathan Alterman, a four-volume edition of his writing
 Yehuda Amichai, a book of poetry
 Y. Bat-Miriam, a book of poetry
 J. Lichtenbaum, a book of poetry
 J. Rabinow, a book of poetry
 J. Ratosh, a book of poetry
 D. Rokeah, a book of poetry
 S. Shalom, a book of poetry
 A. Tur-Malkah, a book of poetry

India
Listed in alphabetical order by first name:
 Indra Dev Bhojvani, also known as "Indur"; Sindhi-language:
 Bijilyun Thyun Barsani
 Praha Bakhun Kadhyun
 Nilmani Phookan, Surya Heno Nami Ahe Ei Nadiyedi ("The sun is said to come descending by this river"), Assamese language
 Harumal Isardas Sadarangani, Ruha D'ino Relo,  Sindhi-language

Spanish language

Latin America
 Carlos Albert, editor, 13 poetas Argentinos de hoy, an anthology from the publisher Editorial Goyanarte (Argentina)
 Alfonso Alcalde, Variaciones sobre el tema del amor y de la muerte (Chile)
 Jorge Carrera Andrade, Angel planetario (Ecuador)
 Mario Benedetti, Uruguay:
 Inventario, Poesía 1950–1958 ("Inventory, Poems 1950–1958")
 Poemas del hoyporhoy ("Poems of Today"), Uruguay
 Esther de Cáceres, Los Cantos del destierro
 Roland Cárdenas, En el invierno de la provincia
 Arturo Corcuera, Noé delirante (Peru)
 Lupo Hernández Rueda, Muerte y memoria (Dominican Republic)
 Francisco Monterde, Sakura, including poetry inspired by epigrams and haiku (Mexico)

Swedish
 Solveig von Schoultz, Sänk ditt ljus

Yiddish
 E. Ayzikovich, a new book of poems
 Sore Birnboym, a new book of poems
 A. Glants-Leyeles, Amerike un ikh ("America and I") (United States)
 Yirmiyohu Hesheles, Lider ("Poems")
 L. Kusman, a new book of poems
 I. M. Levin, a new book of poems
 M. K. Likhtshteyn, a new book of poems
 Nosn Mark, a new book of poems
 Leyb Olitsky, a new book of poems
 Efroyim Oyerbakh, Der step vakht ("The Steppe Is Awake"), with Hassidic mysticism as an inspiration (United States) 
 Nakhmen Raf, a new book of poems
 Eliyohu Reyzman, a new book of poems
 M. Shafir, a new book of poems
 Moyshe Shklar, a new book of poems
 Yaykev Fridman, Nefilim, drama in the form of a symbolic poem
 Hersh Leyb Yung, a new book of poems

Other
 Nanni Balestrini, Come si agisce (Italy)
 Manuel Bandeira, Estrêla da tarde, a selection from previous works (Brazil)
 Ascensio Ferreira, Catimbó e outros poemas, a collection of three previous books (Brazil)
 Stratis Haviaras, Η κυρία με την πυξίδα (Lady with a Compass, Greece)

Awards and honors
 Nobel Prize in Literature: Giorgos Seferis

United Kingdom
 Eric Gregory Award: Ian Hamilton, Stewart Conn, Peter Griffith, David Wevill
 Queen's Gold Medal for Poetry: William Plomer

United States
 February 19 - Robert Frost wins Bollingen Prize
 Consultant in Poetry to the Library of Congress (later the post would be called "Poet Laureate Consultant in Poetry to the Library of Congress"): Howard Nemerov appointed this year.
 American Academy of Arts and Letters Gold Medal in Poetry, William Carlos Williams
 National Book Award for Poetry: William Stafford, Traveling Through the Dark
 Pulitzer Prize for Poetry: William Carlos Williams: Pictures from Breughel
 Fellowship of the Academy of American Poets: Ezra Pound and Allen Tate

Births
 May 19 - Michael Symmons Roberts, English
 May 26 - Simon Armitage, English poet laureate and playwright
 August 7 - Lynn Crosbie, Canadian poet and novelist
 December 24 - Naja Marie Aidt, Danish poet and writer
Also:
 He Xiaozhu, Chinese-Hmong poet, novelist and short story writer
 Michael Derrick Hudson, American poet and librarian
 John Kinsella, Australian
 Don Paterson, Scottish poet, writer and musician
 Claudia Rankine, American poet born in Jamaica and raised there and in New York City.
 Fiona Sampson, English
 Lutz Seiller, German

Deaths
Birth years link to the corresponding "[year] in poetry" article:
 January 29 – Robert Frost, 88, American poet
 February 11 – Sylvia Plath, 30, American-born poet, by suicide
 March 4 – William Carlos Williams, 79, American poet 
 April 18 – Lady Margaret Sackville, 81, English poet and children's author
 April 25 – Christopher Hassall, 51, English lyricist
 May 6 – Mantarō Kubota 久保田万太郎 (born 1889), Japanese author, playwright and poet
 August 1 – Theodore Roethke, 55, American poet and winner of the 1954 Pulitzer Prize for Poetry
 August 3 – Evelyn Scott (born 1893), American poet, novelist and playwright
 September 3
 Eva Dobell, 87, English poet, nurse, and editor best known for her verses related to World War I soldiers
 Louis MacNeice, 55, British poet, playwright and producer, of pneumonia
 September 10 – Bernard Spencer, 53 English poet, apparently in accident
 October 11 – Jean Cocteau, 74, French poet, playwright, novelist, painter, designer, producer and critic
 November 22 – Patrick MacGill, 73, Irish-born "navvy poet" and journalist
 December 2 – Sasaki Nobutsuna 佐佐木信綱 (born 1872), Japanese, Shōwa period tanka poet and scholar of the Nara and Heian periods
 December 24 – Tristan Tzara, 67, French poet (native of Romania) and a founder of Dadaism

See also

 Poetry
 List of poetry awards
 List of years in poetry

References

Poetry
20th-century poetry